SAC-D (meaning Satellite for Scientific Applications-D), also known as Aquarius after its primary instrument, is an Argentine Earth science satellite built by INVAP and operated by CONAE. SAC-D was launched from Vandenberg Air Force Base on 10 June 2011, with a planned mission life of five years. Due to a power system failure, the mission was ended on 8 June 2015.

Description
SAC-D was an international collaboration between the space agencies of Argentina and the United States, CONAE and NASA, with participation from Brazil (INPE), Canada (CSA), France (CNES) and Italy (ASI). It carried five Earth observation instruments (NASA, CONAE, CSA, ASI), two space science instruments (CNES), a data collection instrument (CONAE), and a technology demonstration system (CONAE).

The spacecraft's main instrument, Aquarius, was built by NASA's Jet Propulsion Laboratory and Goddard Space Flight Center. It collected data from 25 August 2011 to 7 June 2015, exceeding its intended three year primary mission. Aquarius' mission was to demonstrate that accurate measurements of salinity could be made from space, and was the first spaceborne instrument to use both passive radiometers and active radar in the L band. By measuring ocean salinity, scientists are better able to understand the Earth's water cycle and ocean circulation. Project scientists later derived a method of pulling soil moisture data from Aquarius' radiometer.

Launch

NASA launched SAC-D from Vandenberg Air Force Base's Space Launch Complex 2W aboard a Delta II 7320-10C on 10 June 2011 at 14:20:13 UTC. The launch was delayed from May 2010 because development of the spacecraft was taking longer than expected.

Accomplishments
The Aquarius instrument's surface salinity measurements contributed to a better understanding of ocean dynamics and advancing climate and ocean models, both from season to season and year to year. The models still are improving El Niño prediction. Aquarius global salinity maps show how freshwater plumes coming from the mouth of large rivers and the precipitation and evaporation over the oceans affect the salinity structure of the ocean.

“The Aquarius sensor collected three years and nine months of valuable data. It was truly a pioneering effort to determine how accurately we could measure ocean salinity from space and for the first time study large and small-scale interactions of the global water cycle.” Aquarius principal investigator Gary Lagerloef of Earth & Space Research, Seattle.

Aquarius provided information into the natural exchange of freshwater between the ocean, atmosphere and sea ice, which influences ocean circulation, weather and climate.

Data from Aquarius showed how extreme floods affect the seas and how low-salinity river plumes affect hurricane intensity. Aquarius data was important to the Salinity Processes in the Upper Ocean Regional Study (SPURS), a year-long international field study of the oceanographic processes that sustain the maximum surface salinities in the central subtropical North Atlantic, and influence global ocean circulation.

The Aquarius instrument successfully achieved its science objectives and completed its primary three-year mission in November 2014.

Failure of spacecraft
On 7 June 2015 at 12:53:17 UTC, telemetry indicated a failure of the spacecraft's Remote Terminal Unit (RTU), causing loss of onboard power regulation and attitude stabilization. While efforts were made to recover the spacecraft, the mission was declared over on 8 June.

Instruments

See also

 2011 in spaceflight
 Jason-1
 Ocean Surface Topography Mission
 Aquarius (SAC-D instrument)

References

External links

 SAC-D website by CONAE
 SAC-D website by INVAP
 Aquarius website by NASA
 Aquarius website by the University of Maine

Spacecraft launched in 2011
Satellites of Argentina
Earth observation satellites